Brachylia rectangulata is a moth in the family Cossidae. It was described by Wichgraf in 1921. It is found in Malawi and Tanzania.

References

Natural History Museum Lepidoptera generic names catalog

Cossinae
Moths described in 1921
Moths of Africa